Nithya Mammen is a Kerala State Award-winning playback singer from Kerala, India, who predominantly works in Malayalam film industry. She was introduced into the movie industry by Kailas Menon and she debuted as a playback singer by singing his song "Nee Himazhayayi" from the movie Edakkad Battalion 06 starring Tovino Thomas. She received Kerala State Film Award in 2020 for the song "Vaathikkalu Vellari pravu" from the film Sufiyum Sujathayum. She completed her Bachelor of Architecture degree from B.M.S. College of Engineering in Bangalore.

References

Year of birth missing (living people)
Living people
Malayalam playback singers
Indian women playback singers
Singers from Kerala
Kerala State Film Award winners